Metro Cash & Carry Pakistan, also known as Metro-Habib, formerly known as Makro Habib Pakistan, is a Pakistani supermarket chain stores operator based in Lahore, Pakistan. It is a subsidiary of German chain Metro Cash & Carry. 

Metro opened its first store in 2007. It operates 10 supermarkets, in total, in Karachi, Lahore, Islamabad, Faisalabad and  Multan .

History
In 2005, Makro Habib Pakistan – a joint venture between the Dutch wholesale giant Makro and the Pakistani conglomerate House of Habib, began operations.

In 2011, Makro and Metro Cash & Carry merged their business in Pakistan.

In 2017, it was named as the best place to work in Pakistan.

In 2019, they expanded in the Punjab, Pakistan and announced that they are opening a store in Multan.

See also
Metro Cash & Carry
Makro

References

Retail companies established in 2007
Supermarkets of Pakistan
Mergers and acquisitions of Pakistani companies
2011 mergers and acquisitions
2007 establishments in Pakistan
Pakistani subsidiaries of foreign companies
Department stores of Pakistan
Companies based in Lahore
House of Habib